A Tribute to the Priest is a tribute album for Judas Priest, released on 9 September 2002.

Track listing
 "Hell Bent for Leather" — Annihilator (2:53)
 Originally released on Killing Machine (US title : Hell Bent For Leather).
 "Metal Gods" — Primal Fear (3:37)
 Originally released on British Steel.
 "Delivering the Goods" (live) — Skid Row (4:50)
 Originally released on Killing Machine (US title : Hell Bent For Leather).
 "Riding on the Wind" — Witchery (2:47)
 Originally released on Screaming for Vengeance.
 "Screaming for Vengeance" — Iced Earth (4:37)
 Originally released on Screaming for Vengeance.
 "Jawbreaker" — Siebenbürgen (3:54)
 Originally released on Defenders of the Faith.
 "Breaking the Law" — HammerFall (2:12)
 Originally released on British Steel.
 "Electric Eye" — Benediction (4:17)
 Originally released on Screaming for Vengeance.
 "Painkiller" — Death (6:02)
 Originally released on Painkiller.
 "All Guns Blazing" — Silent Force (3:24)
 Originally released on Painkiller.
 "Dreamer Deceiver" — Steel Prophet (5:24)
 Originally released on Sad Wings of Destiny.
 "Never Satisfied" — Armored Saint (4:34)
 Originally released on Rocka Rolla.
 "Green Manalishi" — Therion (3:21)
 Originally released on Killing Machine (US title : Hell Bent For Leather).
 "Diamonds And Rust" — Thunderstone (3:25)
 Originally released on Sin After Sin.

References

2002 compilation albums
Judas Priest tribute albums
Heavy metal compilation albums